Kyrgyzstan–Uzbekistan relations refers to the bilateral diplomatic relations between the Republic of Uzbekistan and the Kyrgyz Republic. Uzbekistan dominates southern Kyrgyzstan both economically and politically, based on the large Uzbek population in that region of Kyrgyzstan and on economic and geographic conditions. Much of Kyrgyzstan depends entirely on Uzbekistan for natural gas; on several occasions, former president of Uzbekistan Islam Karimov has achieved political ends by shutting pipelines or by adjusting terms of delivery.

In a number of television appearances broadcast in the Osh and Jalal-Abad provinces of Kyrgyzstan, Karimov has addressed Akayev with considerable condescension; Akayev, in turn, has been highly deferential to his much stronger neighbor. Although Uzbekistan has not shown overt expansionist tendencies, the Kyrgyz government is acutely aware of the implications of Karimov's assertions that he is responsible for the well-being of all Uzbeks, regardless of their nation of residence.

History

Russian and Soviet rules 

The Russians started their conquest in the middle of 19th century. During that era, the Russian Empire had mainly attacked Central Asian Emirates like Emirate of Bukhara or Khanate of Khiva. They also invaded the Qing's Kyrgyz territory and annexed them into Russian Turkestan. By settling the capital in the Uzbek city of Tashkent, the conflict between two peoples began to grow. But unlike the Tajik-Uzbek conflict, the Kyrgyz-Uzbek conflict emerged slower. The Russians referred Kyrgyzs are "nomadic" while Uzbeks are "sedentary".

After the collapse of Russian Empire in 1917, Basmachi Revolt had emerged into a total Central Asian war. The Kyrgyzs and Uzbeks raised hands together and fight against Russian forces. Due to lack of skills and preparation, the Revolt soon failed and the Russians, now under Soviet Union rule, restored the order again.

During World War II, many Caucasian peoples (Georgians, Azerbaijanis, Armenians, Circassians, etc.) were forced to exile. Many of them remained in Central Asia, from which mostly remain in Uzbekistan today. 

However, since the end of the war, conflicts between Kyrgyzs and Uzbeks began to emerge into a larger clash. In 1990, near the collapse of Soviet Union, Osh riots had happened, killing nearly 1000 people, mainly ethnic Kyrgyzs and Uzbeks. The clash began in June and ended in August, but found themselves an unprofitable aftermath.

Transportation
In March 2018, Uzbekistan Railways began a new service, connecting Tashkent with Balykchy.

State Visits

Presidential visits from Uzbekistan to Kyrgyzstan 
 Islam Karimov - (January 16, 1994)
 Islam Karimov - (September 26–27, 2000)  
 Islam Karimov - (2007)
 Islam Karimov - (2013)
 Shavkat Mirziyoyev - (2017)

Presidential visits from Kyrgyzstan to Uzbekistan
 Askar Akayev - (1992)
 Askar Akayev - (1996)
 Askar Akayev - (1998)
 Kurmanbek Bakiyev - (2006) 
 Almazbek Atambayev - (2017)
 Sooronbay Jeenbekov - (2017)

References 

 
Uzbekistan
Bilateral relations of Uzbekistan